Three vessels of the French Navy have borne the name Chevalier Paul ("Knight Paul") in honour of Paul de Fortia, Chevalier Paul.

  (1934–1941), a 
  (1956–1971), a 
  (D621), a 

French Navy ship names